The National Association for Cave Diving (NACD) was founded in 1968 with the goal of improving the safety of scuba diving in caves through training and education. A non-profit corporation, the NACD has its headquarters in Gainesville, Florida but is conducting its administration and operations from High Springs, Florida.

NACD offers training courses and certification in cavern and cave diving, and instructor courses. As part of its mission to raise safety standards in cave diving, the NACD publishes a quarterly journal, holds seminars, and sponsors cave diving projects.

Training
The oldest cave diving training organization, the National Association for Cave Diving (NACD) was established in 1968 for the purpose of achieving safer cave diving through training and education, The goal is not to encourage cavern or cave diving, but rather to aid interested divers in becoming safe cavern and cave divers.

The NACD is

 a professional cave diving organization 
 serves cave divers throughout the world 
 instructors in the US, Mexico, Australia and Europe (14 different countries)
 dedicated to promoting a greater appreciation and a full understanding of the unique underwater cave environment
 dedicated to the special needs required for safe cave diving for the casual visitor and serious explorer alike

The NACD offers special training and certification programs, regular seminars, workshops, and a variety of specialized publications.  The NACD is a 501(c)3 non-profit organization with membership open to all who have an interest in underwater caves.  All members receive discounts on products and admission fees to NACD events.

The purpose of the NACD Training standards is

 To provide each NACD instructor with a general statement of the technical and philosophical principles of cave and cavern diving espoused by the NACD, with a view to insuring that every student receives training consistent with the policies and goals of the NACD. 
 The NACD believes that a professional educator should have the discretion and freedom to bring his or her own unique knowledge, experience, and teaching style to the classroom, whether above or below the water, as long as the result is a well-trained cave or cavern diver. 
 This freedom recognizes the competence and professionalism of each NACD instructor and allows each course to meet adequately the varying needs, interests, and skill levels of each student. 
 The NACD also acknowledges that many facets of cave and cavern diving practice, procedure, and equipment configuration remain topics of debate by equally qualified experts and that it is in the best interest of the student to be presented with differing views.

The goals of the NACD are

 To establish and maintain current guidelines in the form of physical and psychological standards, as well as equipment and techniques necessary for safe cave diving
 To encourage education and dissemination of safe cave diving information throughout the facilities of the organization and to provide a program of education and advanced training essential for safe cave diving
 To achieve closer cooperation and understanding among members of the cave and recreational diving communities (and the general public) so they may work together toward the common goal of increasing safety in cavern and cave diving
 To explore underwater caves and to encourage education and dissemination of information to government, private industry and the general public. To accomplish these goals the NACD is organized to provide the following services

The NACD training program was developed around issues that were causing fatalities in North Florida Springs.  These issues are commonly referred to as the Guidelines of Accident Analysis.  The guidelines, beginning with the most frequent cause for fatalities, are

 Lack of proper training for the overhead environment
 Lack of a continuous guideline to open water
 Failure to use proper gas management to plan dives
 Going too deep for the gas mix used
 Failure to use 3 lights/maintain equipment

Cave diving can be extremely safe with proper training and by always abiding by the rules that have been established.  Thus the need for training in cave diving was established.

The NACD philosophy of safe cave diving is based on a system of checks and balances to insure that NACD standards are maintained in each course. The courses available are as described below:

Cavern Diving
The cavern diving course is taught in a minimum of two days and includes classroom lectures, field exercises, open water line drills and a minimum of four cavern dives. This course emphasizes planning, procedures, environment, propulsion techniques, buoyancy skills, problem solving, equipment modification and the focuses on the specialized needs of the cavern diver.

The NACD encourages every diver to complete a cavern diving course.  The cavern diving course has a significant safety benefit for all active scuba divers who enroll, even if they do not continue to dive in the overhead environment, introduces skills that are usable in all types of diving, develops dive planning abilities and problem solving procedures.

Purpose: To teach the safe exploration of the cavern environment within specified limits. The course develops and establishes minimum skills, knowledge, dive planning abilities, problem solving procedures and the basic abilities to safely cavern dive.

Prerequisites: Advanced open water or equivalent or 15 logged non training open water dives with open water certification.

Minimum Equipment: Mask, fins, 60 cubic foot or greater single cylinder, single hose regulator with an octopus and submersible pressure gauge, exposure suit suitable for diving location, BC with power inflator, slate and tables, knife, timing device, appropriate weight, reel, two battery powered lights.

Intro to Cave Diving
The Introduction to Cave Diving course is taught in a minimum of two days and includes and a minimum of four single tank cave dives. This course is designed to help hone those skills previously learned in cavern. New skills and procedures are taught which are needed for limited single tank cave penetration.

Purpose: To develop a cave diving proficiency within limitations of a single tank. It is for the diver who does not wish the burden of double tanks or is not interested in cave exploration and long decompression dives. It is recreational cave diving course. The course develops and establishes minimum skills, knowledge, dive planning abilities, problem solving procedures and the basic abilities necessary to safely cave dive using single cylinders.

Prerequisites: NACD cavern diver of equivalent and a minimum of 25 logged non-training dives.

Minimum Equipment: All equipment required for cavern, 71.2 cu. ft. tank with dual orifice, primary reel with 400? of guideline, safety reel, additional first stage with a minimum five foot hose, line markers, clothes pins and an additional light for a total of three.

Apprentice to Cave
Although the NACD strongly supports and encourages the four-day Full Cave Diver course, it recognizes that some students may benefit from a program that provides for two separate two-day courses to attain the Full Cave Diver level. The Apprentice Cave Diver course is taught in a minimum of two days with a minimum of four dives in double cylinders. The emphasis of this course is an introduction to jump and gap procedures and continual improvement of the procedures, skills and emergency drills previously presented at the Cavern and Intro to Cave courses.

The Apprentice Cave Diver is considered a training level only and shall result in the issuance of a time-limited temporary card. Such temporary card shall expire of its own force and effect one year from the date of issuance. Upon expiration, the diver will be required to repeat the Apprentice Cave Diver program in full to subsequently dive at that level.

Prerequisites: NACD Introduction to Cave or equivalent.

Minimum Equipment: All equipment for Full Cave, minimum volume 142 cu. ft. in double cylinders with manifold, compass, primary light with minimum of 20 watts, two secondary reels and line arrows.

Cave Diver
The cave diver course is one of the most advanced certifications available today. It is taught in a minimum of four days with a minimum of eight dives. The emphasis of this course is equipment configuration, decompression problem solving, jumps, circuits, traverses, and surveying.

Prerequisites: NACD Introduction to Cave or equivalent.

Minimum Equipment: All equipment for Introduction to Cave, minimum double 71.2 cu. ft. tanks with manifold, compass, primary light with minimum of 20 watts, two secondary reels and line arrows.

Specialty Cave
Purpose: The purpose of the specialty cave diver program is to provide continuing education and experience for the fully trained cave diver under the supervision of a qualified specialty cave diving instructor. As more scuba divers pursue training and become certified cave divers, the interest and demand for training in specialized/advanced techniques in safe cave diving grows at a steady rate. It is the intent of the NACD training program to meet this challenge by providing an organized format that will professionally and safely guide the interested cave diver in the proper direction using the most current procedures.

Prerequisites: NACD full cave diver or equivalent and must verify the completion of 25 or 50 non-training dives depending on specialty.

Specialty courses offered are:
 Exploration/survey techniques
 Stage diving
 Side mount diving
 Submersible Diver propulsion vehicle techniques
 Photography 
 Videography
Currently the NACD is developing courses in Cave Trimix diving and Rebreather instruction

Instructor Courses
Purpose: To develop a logical progression into the training leadership of the NACD by establishing levels of progression. This insures exceptional training and performance of NACD Instructors.

Four leadership levels are available.
 Cavern Instructor
 Introduction to Cave Instructor
 Cave Instructor
 Specialty Cave Instructor

Board of Directors 

The NACD is overseen by a Board of Directors composed of seven cave divers, four Instructor Directors and three Directors.  The Board of Directors is responsible for the operation of the organization and its training program.  The elected officers of the Board of Directors consists of a President, Vice President, Secretary/Treasurer, and Training Director.

, the Board of Directors is as follows:

 President - Rick Murcar 
 Vice President - Vacant
 Secretary/Treasurer - John Sapp
 Training Director - Martin Robson
 Director at Large - Orie Braun
 Director at Large - Vacant
 Director at Large - Vacant
 General Manager - Vacant
 Safety Officer
 Japan - Akio Kitazawa #161

See also

References

External links
 Official site

Underwater diving training organizations
Caving organizations in the United States
cave diving
Diver organizations